In architecture, a loggia (usually) is a covered exterior gallery or corridor, usually on an upper level, but sometimes on the ground level of a building. The outer wall is open to the elements, usually supported by a series of columns or arches.  They can be on principal fronts and/or sides of a building and are not meant for entrance but as an outdoor sitting room. An overhanging loggia may be supported by a baldresca.

From the early Middle Ages, nearly every Italian comune had an open arched loggia in its main square, which served as a "symbol of communal justice and government and as a stage for civic ceremony".

Definition of the Roman loggia 

The main difference between a loggia and a portico is the role within the functional layout of the building. The portico allows entrance to the inside from the exterior and can be found on vernacular and small scale buildings. Thus, it is found mainly on noble residences and public buildings.  A classic use of both is that represented in the mosaics of Basilica of Sant'Apollinare Nuovo of the Royal Palace.

Loggias differ from verandas in that they are more architectural and, in form, are part of the main edifice in which they are located, while verandas are roofed structures attached on the outside of the main building. A "double loggia" occurs when a loggia is located on an upper floor level above a loggia on the floor beneath.

Examples 

 In Italian architecture, a loggia often takes the form of a small, often ornate, summer house built on the roof of a residence to enjoy cooling winds and the view. They were especially popular in the 17th century and are prominent in Rome and Bologna, Italy.
 Grinnell College in Grinnell, Iowa, contains three distinct sets of dorms connected by loggias. The main quad on the Stanford University campus in Stanford, California, prominently features loggias, as do the University Center and Purnell Center for the Arts at Carnegie Mellon University, which frame a quad known as the Cut.
 In the city centre of Chester in England, a number of timber-framed buildings dating from the medieval to Victorian periods have first-floor loggias called the Chester Rows.
 In Russia and Switzerland, a loggia can be a form of recessed balcony on a residential apartment building.
 A loggia was added to the Sydney Opera House in 2006.
 At the archeological site of Hagia Triada on the Greek island of Crete, several loggias constructed around 1400 BC have been located and whose column bases still remain.

See also 
 Madonna della Loggia (Botticelli)
Baldresca
Pedway
Peristyle
Portico
Skyway
Veranda

References

Bibliography

External links 
 
 

Architectural elements
Italian words and phrases